Simon van Poelgeest (27 August 1900 – 9 July 1978) was a Dutch cyclist. He competed in the team pursuit at the 1924 Summer Olympics.

See also
 List of Dutch Olympic cyclists

References

External links
 

1900 births
1978 deaths
Dutch male cyclists
Olympic cyclists of the Netherlands
Cyclists at the 1924 Summer Olympics
Cyclists from Amsterdam